Sidrabene may refer to:

 Sidrabene, Ozolnieki Municipality - a village in Latvia
 Sidrabene (castle) - a castle and region around it till the end of the 13th century in Semigallia
 Sidrabene (camp) - a Latvian children's camp in Burlington, Ontario